Eldarov is an Azerbaijani and Russian surname. The feminine variant is Eldarova (Эльда́рова). El'darov and El'darova are alternative transliterations.

It may refer to:

 Omar Eldarov (born 1927), Azerbaijani sculptor
 Roza Eldarova (1923–2021), Soviet Dagestani politician

Russian-language surnames